The Bellanca T-250 Aries was a light airplane built in the United States in the early 1970s, which achieved only limited production. Designed by Marvin Greenwood while Anderson-Greenwood owned the Bellanca name, it was a conventional low-wing monoplane with retractable tricycle undercarriage and a high T-tail.  Federal Aviation Administration type certification was obtained on 28 July 1976.

Variants
T-250 Aires
AG-250 Aires

Specifications

References

 
  
 
 Bellanca T-250 sales brochure

1970s United States civil utility aircraft
Aires
Low-wing aircraft
Single-engined tractor aircraft
Aircraft first flown in 1973
T-tail aircraft